The 2021–22 Bendigo Spirit season is the 15th season for the franchise in the Women's National Basketball League (WNBL).

Roster

Standings

Results

Regular season

References

External links
Bendigo Spirit Official website

2021–22 WNBL season
WNBL seasons by team
Basketball,Bendigo Spirit
2021 in basketball
2021 in women's basketball
2021–22 in Australian basketball